Kwinter is a surname. Notable people with the surname include:

Monte Kwinter (born 1931), Canadian provincial politician
Sanford Kwinter, Canadian architectural theorist